The Tchupala Falls, a segmented waterfall on the Henrietta Creek, is located in the UNESCO World Heritagelisted Wet Tropics in the Far North region of Queensland, Australia.

Location and features

A further return track of approximately  leads to Wallicher Falls, Silver Creek Falls and Nandroya Falls. Certain sections of the track may be closed for repairs including the steps down to the lower falls and the track east to Crawford's Lookout.

See also

 List of waterfalls of Queensland

References

Waterfalls of Far North Queensland